Górski family is the name of several families of Polish nobility.

See also
Górski, for a list of notable people with this surname.

References

Polish noble families